Aq Kamar may refer to:
 Aq Kamar-e Olya
 Aq Kamar-e Sofla